This article is about the particular significance of the year 1889 to Wales and its people.

Incumbents

Archdruid of the National Eisteddfod of Wales – Clwydfardd

Lord Lieutenant of Anglesey – Richard Davies 
Lord Lieutenant of Brecknockshire – Joseph Bailey, 1st Baron Glanusk
Lord Lieutenant of Caernarvonshire – John Ernest Greaves
Lord Lieutenant of Cardiganshire – Herbert Davies-Evans
Lord Lieutenant of Carmarthenshire – John Campbell, 2nd Earl Cawdor
Lord Lieutenant of Denbighshire – William Cornwallis-West    
Lord Lieutenant of Flintshire – Hugh Robert Hughes 
Lord Lieutenant of Glamorgan – Christopher Rice Mansel Talbot 
Lord Lieutenant of Merionethshire – Robert Davies Pryce
Lord Lieutenant of Monmouthshire – Henry Somerset, 8th Duke of Beaufort
Lord Lieutenant of Montgomeryshire – Edward Herbert, 3rd Earl of Powis
Lord Lieutenant of Pembrokeshire – William Edwardes, 4th Baron Kensington
Lord Lieutenant of Radnorshire – Arthur Walsh, 2nd Baron Ormathwaite

Bishop of Bangor – James Colquhoun Campbell 
Bishop of Llandaff – Richard Lewis
Bishop of St Asaph – Joshua Hughes (until 21 January) Alfred George Edwards (from 25 March)
Bishop of St Davids – Basil Jones

Events
January – First Glamorgan County Council elections are held.
8 February – Nine people drown in a ferry accident at Pembroke Dock.
14 February – The first edition of the North Wales Weekly News is published (under the title Weekly News and Visitors’ Chronicle for Colwyn Bay, Colwyn, Llandrillo, Conway, Deganway and Neighbourhood).
13 March – Twenty miners are killed in an accident at the Brynmally Colliery, Wrexham.
1 April – New elected county councils in England and Wales created by the Local Government Act 1888, take up their powers. That for Radnorshire meets in Presteigne.
June – A lion escapes from a travelling menagerie at Llandrindod Wells.
18 July – Opening of the first dock basin at Barry.
3 August – Opening of Hawarden Bridge.
12 August – The passing of the Welsh Intermediate Education Act marks the beginning of secondary education in Wales.
15 August – Three men are killed in a mining accident at Wenvoe Quarry, Glamorgan.
26 August – Act of incorporation of the Barry Railway Company#Vale of Glamorgan Railway.
Approximate date – The Showmen's Guild of Great Britain is co-founded in Salford as the United Kingdom Van Dwellers Protection Association by Jacob Studt and other active Welsh cinema pioneers.

Arts and literature

Awards
National Eisteddfod of Wales – held at Brecon
Chair – Evan Rees, "Y Beibl Cymraeg"
Crown – Howell Elvet Lewis

New books
Owen Morgan Edwards – O'r Bala i Geneva

Music
Sir Henry Walford Davies – The Future, for chorus and orchestra

Sport
Cricket – Glamorgan County Cricket Club plays its first match, against Warwickshire at Cardiff Arms Park.
Rugby union – Bedwas RFC, Blackwood RFC and Llantwit Major RFC are formed.

Births
12 January – John Bryn Edwards, ironmaster and philanthropist (died 1922)
22 January – John Emlyn-Jones, politician (died 1952)
28 January – Phil Waller, Wales and British Lions rugby player (died 1917)
31 January – Jack Evans, footballer (died 1971)
1 February – John Lewis, philosopher (died 1976)
10 February – Howard Spring, novelist (died 1965)
28 February – George Jeffreys, Pentecostalist (died 1962)
5 May – Stanley Winmill, Wales international rugby union player (died 1940)
24 June – Harry Symonds, cricketer (died 1945)
17 July – Aled Owen Roberts, politician (died 1949)
5 August – William Davies Thomas, academic (died 1954)
10 August – Irene Steer, swimmer (died 1977)
21 August – Henry Lewis, Professor at Swansea University (died 1968)  
23 October – William Havard, Bishop of St Davids and international rugby player (died 1956)
11 December – Cedric Morris, artist (died 1982)

Deaths
21 January – Joshua Hughes, Bishop of St Asaph, 81
27 March – John Bright, Radical politician associated with Llandudno, 77
10 April – Kilsby Jones, nonconformist minister, writer and lecturer, 76
27 May – George Owen Rees, Welsh-Italian doctor, 75
8 June – Gerard Manley Hopkins, Anglo-Welsh poet, 44 (in Ireland)
17 June – John Hughes, industrialist, 73 (in St Petersburg)
26 June – Walter Rice Howell Powell, landowner and politician, 69
28 September – Samuel Goldsworthy, Wales international rugby player, 34
15 October – Sir Daniel Gooch, railway engineer and politician, 73
29 October – Godfrey Darbishire, Wales rugby international player, 36
14 November – James Stephens, stonemason, Chartist, and later Australian trade unionist, 68
18 November – Charles Easton Spooner, railway pioneer, 71
date unknown – G. Phillips Bevan, statistician, geographer and author, 59/60
probable – Richard Williams Morgan, clergyman and poet

References

 
Wales